Cody Christopher Calafiore (born December 13, 1990) is an American reality television personality.  He was the runner up on the reality television series Big Brother 16 in 2014. He was later crowned the winner of Big Brother 22: All-Stars in 2020.

Early life and education
Calafiore was born on December 13, 1990, in Hackensack, New Jersey.

Calafiore attended Monmouth University where he was a member of the soccer team before transferring to Temple University where he graduated from the Fox School of Business and Management with a Bachelors in business administration. He played for the Temple Owls soccer team from 2010 to 2012.

He trialed with the Columbus Crew in pre-season, before an ankle injury ended his soccer career.

Big Brother

Season 16
Calafiore entered the Big Brother house on Day 1 with the first group of contestants. On Day 2, he formed an alliance with Derrick Levasseur called "The Hitmen". Throughout the season, the two secretly worked together with the ultimate goal of being the final 2 players left in the game on finale night. Calafiore initially won the Head of Household (HOH) in Week 2, but his victory was rescinded after producers saw him touch the ground before he hit the buzzer. In week 4, Calafiore won HOH alongside Frankie Grande and nominated Victoria Rafaeli and Brittany Martinez for eviction. Calafiore's nominees lost the Battle of the Block competition, therefore, Calafiore remained HOH and Grande was dethroned.

In Week 8, Calafiore was nominated for eviction alongside Caleb Reynolds by HOH Grande. Calafiore and Reynolds lost the BOTB competition and remained on the block as a result. Calafiore was then nominated aside his former ally Zach Rance after Grande used the POV on Caleb and backdoored Rance. Calafiore survived eviction. In Week 9, he won his second HOH and became the first solo HOH of the season. He nominated Donny Thompson and Nicole Franzel for eviction. The same week, Calafiore won his first Power of Veto and chose to keep the nominations the same, which resulted in Thompson's eviction. In Week 11, Calafiore was nominated alongside Rafaeli by Grande, the HOH. However, due to a twist that reset the game by one week, both Calafiore and Rafaeli got off the block. In Week 12, Calafiore won his second and third Powers of Veto of the season. On Day 90, he was the sole vote to evict Reynolds. On Day 97, he won the final HOH of the season. He evicted Rafaeli and took his ally, Levasseur, to the final 2, a move considered by fans as one of the worst in the show's history. Calafiore became season's runner-up, losing to Levasseur on a 7–2 vote, winning $50,000.

Calafiore's older brother Paulie was a contestant on Big Brother 18, where he placed eighth.

Season 22

In 2020, Calafiore returned to compete in the show's second All-Star season. He was HoH in weeks 1, 8, 9 and 12, giving him a total of 4 HoH victories and reigns. He won the PoV in weeks 3, 8, 9 and 11, giving him a total 4 PoV victories. He made it to the final 3 without being nominated. At the final 3, Calafiore won final HoH, becoming the first ever houseguest to win the final HoH twice, as well as the first ever houseguest to make it to the final 2 without ever going on the block. Calafiore won the show by a unanimous 9–0 vote. He became just the second houseguest in Big Brother U.S. history to have won in the Final 2 (Big Brother 22) and to have lost in the Final 2 (Big Brother 16) after Dan Gheesling won Big Brother 10 and finished runner-up in Big Brother 14. He also became the second ever houseguest not to receive an eviction vote against him and received all the jury votes after Gheesling.

Career
In 2014, Calafiore appeared in an ad campaign for American underwear brand C-IN2 and was in several issues of Seventeen as part of their Hot Guys Panel. Prior to his television appearance, Calafiore spent two years as an event host at Total Entertainment in Hackensack, New Jersey. He was also a sales associate at ADP for six months in 2015. Following his appearance on Big Brother 16, Calafiore signed with New York-based modeling agency Soul Artist Management. He has since appeared in Winq Magazine, Men's Fitness, LOVE Magazine, Risbel Magazine, and three editorials for The Fashionisto. Calafiore has appeared in fashion shows as a model for Malan Breton, Gents, and Ricardo Seco. In 2016 Calafiore co-starred in the independent film What Happened Last Night. Calafiore joined Keller Williams Realty, representing Shrewsbury, New Jersey, in October, 2019. In July 2021, he began a podcast with fellow Big Brother winner Derrick Levasseur called "The Winner's Circle" where they discuss the current season of Big Brother. In January 2023, Calafiore appeared as a contestant on Peacock's reality TV series The Traitors.

Filmography

References

External links
 
 Official Cody Calafiore Facebook

1990 births
Living people
Actors from Hackensack, New Jersey
Association footballers not categorized by position
Big Brother (American TV series) winners
Fox School of Business and Management alumni
Male actors from New Jersey
Male models from New Jersey
People from Howell Township, New Jersey
Temple Owls men's soccer players
Temple University alumni
Association football players not categorized by nationality
Monmouth Hawks men's soccer players
American podcasters